The Airport Parkway is a proposed major highway development project in the Jackson, Mississippi, metropolitan area planned to connect Interstate 55 on the west, High Street in downtown Jackson, Mississippi Highway 25 (Lakeland Drive), and Mississippi Highway 475 (Airport Road) in Flowood at Jackson-Evers International Airport in the east. Approved in 2008, no construction has commenced as of 2022.

The  project includes a new crossing of the Pearl River. The entire road is planned to be operated as a toll road.  Once complete, it will be signed as Interstate 755.

The Airport Parkway Commission that was formed in 1995 to help advance the project consists of the mayors of Pearl, Flowood, and Jackson, the three cities through which the Airport Parkway would run. The U.S. Congress allocated $35 million for the project. The environmental impact statement was completed in 1999. Right-of-way acquisition for the portion of the project in Rankin County (about 40% of the total right-of-way requirement) was completed at a cost of $15 million. As of December 2007, the total cost to complete the project was estimated at about $400 million.

References

Parkways in the United States
Transportation in Hinds County, Mississippi

Jackson metropolitan area, Mississippi
Jackson, Mississippi